Steinitz is a German surname. Notable people with the surname include:

 Clara Steinitz (1852–1931), German writer
 Wilhelm Steinitz (1836–1900), Czech-Austrian chess grandmaster and first world champion
 Ernst Steinitz (1871–1928), German mathematician
 Wolfgang Steinitz (1905–1967), German linguist and ethnologist
 Paul Steinitz (1909–1988), English conductor and Bach scholar
 Yuval Steinitz (born 1958), Israeli politician

German-language surnames